Something from Nothing: The Art of Rap is a 2012 American documentary film directed and executive produced by Ice-T and co-directed by Andy Baybutt. It focuses on the craft of writing and performing rap verses, and all the interviewees are musicians of the genre and friends of Ice-T. Producer Paul Toogood states on the DVD release that the genesis of the project stemmed from a conversation he had with Ice-T in which he asked him how he wrote "seminal tracks" such as "6 in the Mornin'" and "Colors".

Ice-T replied that in his thirty-year hip-hop career, no one had ever asked him that.  Grandmaster Caz features more than any other interviewee, and the movie returns to his home on multiple occasions throughout showing his creative process as he writes "The Art Of Rap" rap, which he then delivers.  It was shot on location, but mainly in New York, Los Angeles and Detroit. The film was an official selection for the Sundance Film Festival where it was screened as a premiere on January 2, 2012. The film was released in the theaters on June 15, 2012 and in the UK it was released on July 20, 2012.

Cast 
In alphabetical order, as named in the film:
 Afrika Bambaataa
 Big Daddy Kane
 B-Real
 Bun B
 Cashout Chris
 Chino XL
 Chuck D
 Common
 Dana Dane
 Denis "Deft" Matinez
 DJ Premier
 DMC
 Doug E. Fresh
 Dr. Dre
 Eminem
 Freddie Demarco
 Grandmaster Caz
 Ice Cube
 Ice-T
 Immortal Technique
 Joe Budden
 Kanye West
 Kool Boy
 Kool Keith
 Kool Moe Dee
 KRS-One
 Loke
 Lord Finesse
 Lord Jamar
 Marley Marl
 MC Lyte
 Melle Mel
 Nas
 Puerto Rico
 Q-Tip
 Raekwon
 Rakim
 Ras Kass
 Redman
 Royce da 5'9"
 Run
 Salt
 Snoop Dogg
 Tha Furious One
 Treach
 WC
 Xzibit
 Yasiin (formerly known as Mos Def)

Soundtrack album
An official soundtrack to the film was released on CD and as a digital download featuring fifteen songs selected from the movie, seven freestyles as performed in the film, plus one track "Harder Than You Think (Just Like That)" by Public Enemy, which featured in the film's trailer but does not feature in the actual movie. The first track is an official live acapella freestyle by Ice-T, but in the film's credits, this track is referred to as "Chrome Plated 357". Ice-T is also featured on Immortal Technique's live acapella freestyle but is not credited as such on the soundtrack.

References

External links

2012 films
2012 documentary films
Ice-T
2010s hip hop films
Documentary films about hip hop music and musicians
2010s English-language films